Brian Ashton may refer to:

Brian Ashton (rugby union) (born 1946), English rugby union player and former Head Coach of the England national rugby union team
Brian Ashton (politician) (born 1950), Canadian politician
Brian Ashton (soccer) (born 1974), Canadian soccer player